Dazhu is a county of Sichuan Province, China. It is under the administration of Dazhou city. In 2019 it had a population of 1,082,700 of which 241,000 in the urban area.

Dazhu is known for its ramie, glutinous rice and for giant timber bamboo.

Administrative divisions 
Dazhu is subdivided into 3 subdistricts, 23 towns and 5 townships.

Climate

Born in Dazhu 

 Shen Zhonghou
 Meng Anming

References

.

County-level divisions of Sichuan
Dazhou